Whistler Transit Ltd., a division of Pacific Western Transportation, operates the public transit service in Whistler and the Pemberton Valley area of British Columbia, Canada. Buses operate every day between 5:30 a.m. and 3 a.m. and are equipped with racks for skis or bikes, depending on the season.

Funding for the Whistler Transit System is shared between the Resort Municipality of Whistler and BC Transit. Funding for the Pemberton Valley Transit System is shared between BC Transit and the Squamish–Lillooet Regional District through a partnership with the Village of Pemberton and Lil'wat First Nation Bus services in Whistler are operated by Whistler Transit Ltd. while services within Pemberton are operated by Pemberton Taxi.

Transit facility
Whistler Transit Operations and Maintenance Facility was built to accommodate an expansion in the level of service, resulting in a growth of the transit fleet. The building was opened in late 2009, prior to the 2010 Winter Olympics.

Omicron Architecture Engineering Construction acted both as design-builder and consultant for the  facility, which includes maintenance and administration buildings, refueling stations and covered parking for up to 50 buses.

The project won the Canadian Design-Build Institute's 2010 first place award in the industrial category.

Routes
Whistler Transit operates several local routes in Whistler, a commuter connection from Pemberton and a local route in Pemberton

Whistler and Valley Express

Transit in Whistler previously operated under a unique branding, whereas most other systems used a standard BC Transit style. With the coming of the Winter Olympics in 2010 and the upgrade of their fleet, a coordinated look was adopted.

See also

 Public transport in Canada

References

External links
Whistler Transit System
Pemberton Valley Transit System

Whistler, British Columbia
Pemberton Valley
Transit agencies in British Columbia